Chantry is a suburban residential area within the town of Ipswich, in the Ipswich district, in the county of Suffolk, England. It lies to the south of the town. The area is included in the Gipping ward of Ipswich Borough Council. It has a population of over 30,000.

History 
Chantry estate was built in the late 1950s and early 1960s, originally as an area of council housing. In recent years it has been extended with the development of private housing around the original development.

A hoard of Roman era gold was discovered during building work in Holcombe Crescent in 1968, with the initial find consisting of five Romano-British gold torcs (decorative neck rings). The items show design features associated with the Iron Age La Tène culture, & are thought to date from around 75 BC. A sixth torc was found in the following year, some distance from the others but thought to be from the same collection. The find’s proximity to the Belstead Brook has led to speculation that this hoard was associated with a spring or holy well in the area. The torcs are now housed in the British Museum in London, with copies on show in Ipswich Museum.

Amenities 
Chantry has a public library, several pubs, shopping parades, a community centre and health care providers. It is well served by public transport. Several churches are located in the area, including St. Francis in Hawthorn Drive Shepherd Drive Baptist Church and St Mark's Roman Catholic church in Hawthorn Drive.

Chantry Academy serves the local area along with several primary, junior and infant schools, such as The Willows Primary School, The Oaks Primary School, Gusford Primary School and Sprites Primary Academy. A co-educational independent school, St Joseph's College, is also located in the area.

See also 
 Chantry Park

References 

Ipswich Districts